La Uña is a locality located in the municipality of Acebedo, in León province, Castile and León, Spain. As of 2020, it has a population of 37.

Geography 
La Uña is located 96km northeast of León, Spain.

References

Populated places in the Province of León